The Lachlan Island, part of the Maria Island Group, is an island with an area of about  lying close to the south-eastern coast of Tasmania, Australia. The island is located near the Freycinet Peninsula, situated midway between Maria Island and the Tasmanian mainland.

Fauna
Recorded breeding seabird and wader species are little penguin, short-tailed shearwater, kelp gull, sooty oystercatcher and Caspian tern.  Rabbits were introduced in the early 20th century and were eventually eradicated in the 1990s.

See also

 List of islands of Tasmania
 Tasmania's offshore islands

References

Islands of Tasmania
South East coast of Tasmania